Egypt participated in the 2010 Summer Youth Olympics in Singapore.

Jihan El Midany was the first woman flagbearer for Egypt at any Olympic event.

Medalists

Archery

Boys

Girls

Mixed Team

Athletics

Boys
Track and road events

Field events

Girls
Field events

Badminton

Boys

Basketball

Boys

Boxing

Equestrian

Fencing

Group Stage

Knock-Out Stage

Gymnastics

Artistic gymnastics
Boys'

Girls'

Rhythmic gymnastics

Individual

Group

Handball

Modern pentathlon

Girls

Boys

Mixed Relay

Shooting

Boys

Girls

Swimming

Table tennis

Boys

Girls

Mixed Teams

Taekwondo

Women's

Men's

Volleyball

Girls

Weightlifting

Boys

Girls

Wrestling

Freestyle

Greco-Roman

References

External links

Competitors List: Egypt

2010 in Egyptian sport
Nations at the 2010 Summer Youth Olympics
Egypt at the Youth Olympics